Promise Me may refer to:

 Promise Me (novel), a 2006 novel by Harlan Coben
 "Promise Me" (Beverley Craven song), 1990
 "Promise Me" (Lil Suzy song), 1994
 "Promise Me", a song by Badflower from OK, I'm Sick, 2019
 "Promise Me", a song by the Cover Girls from Show Me, 1986
 "Promise Me", a song by Dead by April from Dead by April, 2009
 "Promise Me", a song by Luther Vandross from Forever, for Always, for Love, 1982
 "Promise Me", a song by Modest Fok, 1992
 "Promise Me", a song by the Saturdays from On Your Radar, 2011
 "Promise Me", a song by We Came as Romans from Cold Like War, 2017
 Promise Me, an album by CoCo Lee, 1994
 Promise Me, an album by Nayobe, or the title song, 1990